Amy Grace Gordon (born 3 October 2001) is an English cricketer who currently plays for Surrey. She plays primarily as a right-arm medium bowler, as well as a right-handed lower-order batter. She has previously played for Surrey Stars, South East Stars and Welsh Fire.

Early life
Gordon was born on 3 October 2001 in Redhill, Surrey.

Domestic career
Gordon made her county debut in 2016, for Surrey against Worcestershire in the Twenty20 Cup. Overall, she took 5 wickets at an average of 9.00 in the Twenty20 Cup that season, including her Twenty20 best bowling figures of 3/15 against Staffordshire. Gordon was part of the Surrey side that won promotion to Division 1 of the County Championship in 2018, contributing 84 runs including her List A high score of 31*. In 2021, she scored 126 runs and took 3 wickets for Surrey in the Twenty20 Cup. In the 2022 Women's Twenty20 Cup, Gordon was Surrey's leading run-scorer, with 102 runs, and their joint-leading wicket-taker, with 6 wickets. She scored her maiden Twenty20 half-century during the tournament, scoring 54 against Hampshire.

Gordon was called up to play for Surrey Stars in the Women's Cricket Super League in 2018 midway through the tournament, as an injury-replacement for Grace Gibbs. Whilst she did not play for the side that season, she was a full member of the squad in 2019, playing 7 matches and taking 2 wickets at an average of 32.00.

In 2020, Gordon played for South East Stars in the Rachael Heyhoe Flint Trophy. She appeared in three matches and took 1 wicket, against Southern Vipers. In 2021, she was in Welsh Fire's squad in The Hundred, but did not play a match.

References

External links

2001 births
Living people
People from Redhill, Surrey
Surrey women cricketers
Surrey Stars cricketers
South East Stars cricketers